
Gmina Przytyk is a rural gmina (administrative district) in Radom County, Masovian Voivodeship, in east-central Poland.

Villages
Gmina Przytyk contains the villages and settlements of Dęba, Domaniów, Duży Las, Gaczkowice, Glinice, Goszczewice, Jabłonna, Jadwinów, Jagodno, Kaszewska Wola, Kolonia Zameczek, Krzyszkowice, Maksymilianów, Młódnice, Mścichów, Oblas, Oblas-Leśniczówka, Ostrołęka, Podgajek, Posada, Potkanna, Przytyk, Sewerynów, Słowików, Stary Młyn, Stefanów, Studzienice, Suków, Sukowska Wola, Witoldów, Wola Wrzeszczowska, Wólka Domaniowska, Wrzeszczów, Wrzos, Wygnanów, Zameczek, Żerdź and Żmijków.

Neighbouring gminas
Gmina Przytyk is bordered by the gminas of Potworów, Przysucha, Radzanów, Stara Błotnica, Wieniawa, Wolanów and Zakrzew.

References
 Polish official population figures 2006

Przytyk
Radom County